Joseph Samuel "Bello" Snyder (February 7, 1912 – May 19, 1998) was an American professional basketball player. He played for the Buffalo Bisons in the National Basketball League during the 1937–38 season and averaged 5.8 points per game.

After basketball, Snyder and his wife owned and operated Camp Eagle Cove in the Adirondack Mountains.

References

1912 births
1998 deaths
American men's basketball players
Basketball players from New York (state)
Buffalo Bisons (NBL) players
Forwards (basketball)
Sportspeople from Rochester, New York